Duivenbode's riflebird is a bird in the family Paradisaeidae that is a presumed intergeneric hybrid between a magnificent riflebird and lesser lophorina. The common name commemorates Maarten Dirk van Renesse van Duivenbode (1804-1878), Dutch trader of naturalia on Ternate.

History
Three adult male specimens are recorded of this hybrid: one each in the American Museum of Natural History and British Natural History Museum; the third type specimen in the Dresden Natural History Museum was destroyed in World War II. They derive from the area inland of Yule Island in south-eastern New Guinea, not far from Port Moresby.

Notes

References
 
 

Hybrid birds of paradise
Birds of New Guinea
Intergeneric hybrids